The Bishop of Brisbane may refer to:

 Anglican Bishop of Brisbane, precursor title of the Anglican Archbishop of Brisbane
 Roman Catholic Bishop of Brisbane, precursor title of the Roman Catholic Archbishop of Brisbane